Wratting may refer to the following places in England:

 Great Wratting, Suffolk
 Little Wratting, Suffolk
 West Wratting, Cambridgeshire